Brenainn mac Cairbre, 12th King of Uí Maine, died 597 or 601.

Brenainn is only the second king of Uí Maine  listed in the Irish annals. Confusion surrounds his obit, with a five-year variation given. He was succeeded by Aedh Buidhe who died in 600. 

Events which occurred in Ireland during these years included:

 595 - death of Alithir, Abbot of Clonmacnoise.
 596 - Suibhne mac Colman Beg, King of Mide, was slain by Áed Sláine.
 597 - battle of Sleamhain, in Mide.
 597 - death of King Uatu mac Áedo of Connacht
 601 - battle of Slaibhre in Leinster

References

 Annals of Ulster at CELT: Corpus of Electronic Texts at University College Cork
 Annals of Tigernach at CELT: Corpus of Electronic Texts at University College Cork
Revised edition of McCarthy's synchronisms at Trinity College Dublin.
 Byrne, Francis John (2001), Irish Kings and High-Kings, Dublin: Four Courts Press, 

People from County Galway
People from County Roscommon
6th-century Irish monarchs
Kings of Uí Maine